Rossiyskaya arkheologiya, formerly Sovetskaya arkheologiya, is an academic journal dedicated to the subject of archaeology, published quarterly since 1957.

References 

Archaeology journals
Russian-language journals
Russian Academy of Sciences academic journals